On 16 May 2015, a passenger train collided with a tractor and trailer obstructing a level crossing at Ibbenbüren, North Rhine-Westphalia, Germany. Two people were killed and 41 were injured.

Accident
At 11:31 CEST (09:31 UTC), a WestfalenBahn passenger train travelling from Osnabrück was in collision with a tractor and trailer that were obstructing a level crossing at Ibbenbüren, North Rhine-Westphalia, Germany. It was reported that the tractor and trailer, which contained liquid manure, became stuck on the level crossing. Extensive damage was caused to the front and side of the leading carriage of the train, which was a Stadler FLIRT electric multiple unit. It came to a halt  past the level crossing. The train was travelling at around  when it collided with the tractor and trailer.

Two people were killed and 41 were injured, six seriously. Most of the injured were treated for shock. One of those killed was a passenger. The train driver was the other fatality. Passengers from the train were taken to a nearby community centre. Following the accident, a substitute bus service was put in place between Bielefeld and Ibbenbüren. The damaged train was removed to a depot at Rheine. The line through Ibbenbüren reopened on 17 May.

Investigation
The tractor driver may face charges of negligent homicide and causing actual bodily harm by negligence.

References

See also
Elaborated technical concept after accident (in German)
White Paper (Deutsche Bahn)  (in German)
Elaborated Guide (emergency management)  (in German)

Railway accidents in 2015
Level crossing incidents in Germany
2015 in Germany
Ibbenbüren